Christian Gerhaher (born 24 July 1969, in Straubing) is a German baritone and bass singer in opera and concert, particularly known as a Lieder singer.

Career 

Christian Gerhaher studied with Paul Kuën and Raimund Grumbach at the Hochschule für Musik und Theater München, and Lied with Friedemann Berger, already together with his accompanist for decades to come, Gerold Huber. He took master classes with Dietrich Fischer-Dieskau  (whose voice Gerhaher's remarkably resembles), Elisabeth Schwarzkopf and Inge Borkh.

He was a member of the opera in Würzburg from 1998 to 2000, performing in Thomas Hengelbrock's production of Così fan tutte, in Weber's Der Freischütz with the Cappella Coloniensis, and Papageno in Achim Freyer's staging of The Magic Flute. a role that he sang as his debut at the Salzburg Festival in 2006. In 2005 he portrayed the title role of Monteverdi's L'Orfeo at the Opern- und Schauspielhaus Frankfurt where he appeared as Wolfram in Wagner's Tannhäuser in 2007.

In concert he has collaborated with Helmuth Rilling, Nikolaus Harnoncourt, Neville Marriner, Philippe Herreweghe, Heinz Holliger and Trevor Pinnock, among others.

Christian Gerhaher has performed and recorded Lieder with pianist Gerold Huber, such as Schubert's Winterreise, Die schöne Müllerin, Schwanengesang and Gesänge des Harfners. His Schubert album Abendbilder with Gerold Huber won a Gramophone Award for Solo vocal in 2006. More songs with piano or chamber ensemble have included Brahms' Vier ernste Gesänge and Martin's Jedermann Monologues, Mahler's Lieder eines fahrenden Gesellen and Kindertotenlieder. He participated in the project Terezín / Theresienstadt of Anne Sofie von Otter to record songs written in the concentration camp of Terezín. Supported by her pianist Bengt Forsberg (also accordion, guitar and double bass) and his, Gerold Huber, Bebe Risenfors (accordion, guitar), Ib Hausmann (clarinet), Philip Dukes (viola), Josephine Knight (cello) and Daniel Hope (violin) they perform music written in the concentration camp by the artists Ilse Weber, Karel Švenk, Adolf Strauss, Martin Roman, Hans Krása, Carlo S. Taube, Viktor Ullmann and Pavel Haas.

With Rilling and his Gächinger Kantorei he appeared at the 70th birthday concert in 2003 and recorded Bach's Mass in B minor and Christmas Oratorio and  Britten's War Requiem, among others.

In 2009, he was awarded the Rheingau Musikpreis of the Rheingau Musik Festival. He appeared at the festival in 2010 with Gerold Huber to celebrate Gustav Mahler's 150th birthday, singing Sieben Lieder aus letzter Zeit (Seven Songs of Latter Days) and from Das Lied von der Erde the movements Der Einsame im Herbst (The lonely one in Autumn) and Der Abschied (The Farewell). In 2011 they performed the composer's Lieder eines fahrenden Gesellen, Des Knaben Wunderhorn and Kindertotenlieder.

In 2010, he was awarded the Midem special prize "male vocalist".

He had his debut at Covent Garden London in 2010 in Richard Wagner's opera Tannhäuser and received the Laurence Olivier Award for Outstanding Achievement in Opera for his performance as Wolfram in March 2011.

He is a professor in the Hochschule für Musik und Theater, München.

Selected recordings 

 Franz Schubert: Winterreise, piano: Gerold Huber, RCA Sony BMG, January 2001
 Johannes Brahms: Vier ernste Gesänge, Franz Schubert: Gesänge des Harfners and various Lieder, Frank Martin: Sechs Monologe aus Jedermann, piano: Gerold Huber, Arte Nova, August 2002
 Gustav Mahler: Kindertotenlieder, piano: Gerold Huber, Lieder eines fahrenden Gesellen, Hyperion Ensemble, Arte Nova, February 2003
 Joseph Haydn: Die Schöpfung, Concentus Musicus Wien, Arnold Schoenberg Chor, Dorothea Röschmann, Michael Schade, conductor Nikolaus Harnoncourt, harmonia mundi, February 2004
 Robert Schumann: Dichterliebe und gemischte Lieder, piano: Gerold Huber, RCA, October 2004
 Carl Orff: Carmina Burana, Berliner Philharmoniker, conductor Simon Rattle, EMI, 2005
 Felix Mendelssohn: Elias, Leipzig Gewandhaus Orchestra, conductor Herbert Blomstedt, RCA, Juli 2005
 Schubert: Abendbilder (various Lieder), piano: Gerold Huber, RCA, January 2006
 Mendelssohn: Die Heimkehr aus der Fremde, part of Kauz, Stuttgart Radio Symphony Orchestra, conductor Helmuth Rilling, hänssler classic, 2006
 Haydn: Orlando paladino, part of Rodomonte, Concentus musicus, conductor Nikolaus Harnoncourt, harmonia mundi, May 2006
 Wolfgang Amadeus Mozart: Die Zauberflöte, part of Papageno, Wiener Philharmoniker, conductor Riccardo Muti, Decca, 2006
 Johann Sebastian Bach: Mass in B minor, Gächinger Kantorei, Bach-Collegium Stuttgart, conductor Helmuth Rilling, hänssler classic, 2007
 Bach: Christmas Oratorio, Concentus Musicus Wien, Arnold Schoenberg Chor, conductor Nikolaus Harnoncourt, harmonia mundi, November 2007
 Terezín / Theresienstadt, Lieder by Victor Ullmann and others, Anne Sofie von Otter, Deutsche Grammophon, 2007
 Schumann: Melancholie - Liederkreis op. 39 und gemischte Lieder, piano: Gerold Huber, RCA, March 2008
 Schumann: Das Paradies und die Peri, Symphonieorchester des Bayerischen Rundfunks, conductor Nikolaus Harnoncourt, RCA, March 2008
 Benjamin Britten: War Requiem, Annette Dasch, James Taylor, conductor Helmuth Rilling, hänssler classic, September 2008
 Mahler: Das Lied von der Erde, Orchestre symphonique de Montréal, Klaus Florian Vogt, conductor Kent Nagano, Sony Music, April 2009
 Karl Amadeus Hartmann, Des Simplicius Simplicissimus Jugend, Symphonieorchester des Bayerischen Rundfunks, conductor: Ulf Schirmer, September 2009
 Haydn: Die Jahreszeiten, Concentus Musicus Wien, Arnold Schoenberg Chor, conductor Nikolaus Harnoncourt, harmonia mundi, March 2009
 Schumann: Szenen aus Goethes Faust, Royal Concertgebouw Orchestra, conductor Nikolaus Harnoncourt, RCO live, July 2009
 Othmar Schoeck: Notturno, Rosamunde Quartett, ECM, September 2009
 Mahler: Lieder, piano: Gerold Huber, Sony Music, October 2009
 Othmar Schoeck: Elegie, Op. 36, Sony Music, April 2022

Recent Albums

References

External links 

Christian Gerhaher website (in German)
Christian Gerhaher artist of Gasteig Munich
Christian Gerhaher Sony de 
Mahler/Gerhaher/Huber: Lieder Andrew Clements, The Guardian, 14 January 2010
Christian Gerhaher »Ein bisschen Qual gehört dazu« (pictured), interview of Christian Gerhaher in Frankfurter Neue Presse of 28 January 2010 (in German)
Mahler: Lieder - Christian Gerhaher (baritone), Gerold Huber (piano) review in The Sunday Times'', 31 January 2010

University of Music and Performing Arts Munich alumni
Academic staff of the University of Music and Performing Arts Munich
Members of the Academy of Arts, Berlin
Living people
1969 births
German operatic baritones
20th-century German male opera singers
21st-century German male opera singers